Pleasure and Suffering (al-Mutåt wal-Âzab or al-Moutʾah wal-ʾadhâb) is an Egyptian film made circa 1971. The film was directed by Niazi Mostafa. The principal actors are Shams al-Baroudi and Nour al-Sherif.

The main characters are a group of four friends. Nana (Baroudy), a fashion designer, is the leader of the group. Nana has a fear of men, and she expresses anguish when her girlfriend Salwa (Safa' Abu Sâoud) says that her father is arranging a marriage for Salwa to one of her father's coworkers. Samar Habib, author of Female Homosexuality in the Middle East: Histories and Representations, describes Nana as an "ice-queen". Elham (Suhair Ramzi) compulsively steals. She receives sexual pleasure from stealing. The fourth friend is Fifi. Another character is Âdel (Nour Sherif), a male character who is later revealed in the film as a con-man. Âdel expresses an interest in Nana, but Fifi tells Âdel that "she does not like men, she has a complex." Ultimately Âdel and Nana fall in love.

Habib said "The representation of female sexuality in this film thus tends towards the popular understanding that homosexual inclination in women is born out of trauma or a hatred for men, which can be corrected if the right man comes along." Habib argues that the film portrays female homosexuality as something that is transient.

See also

 Cinema of Egypt
 All My Life
 A Girl Named Maĥmood
 Malatily Bathhouse

References
 Armes, Roy. Dictionary of African Filmmakers. Indiana University Press, July 11, 2008. , 9780253000422.
 Habib, Samar. Female Homosexuality in the Middle East: Histories and Representations. Routledge, July 18, 2007. , 9780415956734.

Notes

Egyptian LGBT-related films